This is a glossary of acronyms and initials used for organisations in the Russian Federation and formerly the USSR. The Latin-alphabet names are phonetic representations of the Cyrillic originals, and variations are inevitable.

Organisations
 - 
 Aero-geological Industrial Association

 [otdel] Aviatsii, Ghidroaviahtsii i Opytnovo Samolyotostroyeniya - [section for] aviation, hydro-aviation and experimental construction

 Aviatsionnaya Krasnoznamyonnaya Diviziya Osobogo Naznacheniya - Red Banner Special Task Aviation Division

 - organisation for importing and licensing American products

 Aviatsionnyy Nauchno-proizvodstvennyy Kompleks MIG – aviation science and production complex MiG

 Aviatsionnyi Nauchno-Teknichyeskii Kompleks – Aviation scientific-technical complex

 Aviatsionnyi Nauchno-Teknichyeskii Kompleks – Tupolev aviation scientific-technical complex

 AviaRemontnyy Zavod – aircraft repair factory

 Akademiya Vozdushnogo Flota – air fleet academy

 – independent Arctic directorate of Aeroflot

 – squadron part of an LO

 - all-union aviation export agency

 Aviatsiya i Khimiya - Voluntary Society for Assistance to the Soviet Aircraft and Chemical Industry

 – Vnito aviation department of the all-union scientific and technical research organisation

Gosudarstvenniy Trest Aviatsionniy Promishlennosti - State Aviation Industry Trust

 - central aviation management organisation Sept 1923

 Byuro Novykh Konstruktsiy - bureau of new designs

 Byuro Novoy Tekhniki - bureau of new technology NKAP

 Byuro Osobykh Konstruktsiy - bureau of special design

 – see TsAGI

 – see TsKB

 – see TsIAM

 – see TsNII

 – see TsUMVS

 – secret police 1918-22 became OGPU

 - (Dyuflon & Konstaninovich factory)

 - Deutsche Russki Air German/Russian airline 1922

 Dolgoprudnenskiy Mashinostroitel'nyy Zavod – Dolgoproodnyy Machinery Factory

 Russian airline 1922

 Dobrovol'noe Obschestvo Sodesystviya Armii Aviatcii i Flotu - voluntary society for assistance to the army, air force and navy

 Eksperimentahl'nyy Mashinostroitel'nyy Zavod - experimental machinery factory

 Federal'noye Agentstvo Pravitel'stvennoy Svyazi i Informatsii – federal agency of government communications and information

 Federatsiya Lyubiteley Aviatsii Rossiyskoy Federatsii – aviation enthusiasts federation of Russia

 Gosudarstvenny Aviatsionnyy Zavod – state aviation plant/factory

 Gazodinamicheskaya Laboratoriya - Gas Dynamics Laboratory

 Gosudarstvenny Elektro-Energeticheskiy Institut - State Institute of Electricity and Energy

 Gosudarstvenny Institoot po Raketnoy Dvigatel'naya - group for studying reaction engines

 Gosudarstvenny Institut po Raketnoy Tekhnike – state institute for rocket technology

 Gosudarstvenny Krasnoznamyonnyy Naoochno-Issledovatel'skiy Institoot Grazhdahnskoy Aviahtsii -  state red banner air forces research institute

 Gosudarstvenny Komitet Po Aviatsionnoy Promyshlennosti  - state committee on aviation industry

 Gosudarstvenny  Komitet Po Aviatsionny Tekhnike -  state committee on aircraft technology

 Gosudarstvenniy Komitet Oborony - state defence committee

 Gosudarstvenny Komitet Po Rahdioelektronike – state committee for electronic equipment

 Glavnoe Pravlenie Obédinennikh Aviapromishlennikh – Chief Directorate of united aviation industry factories

 – Main Directorate of northern sea routes

 Gosudarstvenny Lyotno-Ispytahtel'nyy Tsentr – state flight test centre formerly GNIKI VVS

 Gosudarstvenny Nauchno-Ispytatel'ny Krasnoznamenny Institut  VVS – State research test institute for the air forces

 Gosudarstvenny Nauchno-Issledovatel'skiy Institut Aviatsionnykh Sistem -  state scientific research institute for aircraft systems

 Gosudarstvenny Nauchno-Issledovatel'skiy Institut Grazhdahnskoy Aviahtsii -  state scientific research institute for civil aviation  replaced Gos NII GVF

Gosudarstvenny Nauchno-Issledovatel'skiy Institut Grazdahnskovo Vozdooshnovo Flota  - state scientific research institute for civil air fleet

 Gosudarstvenny Nauchno-Issledovatel'skiy Institut Grazhdahnskoy Aviahtsii -  state air forces research institute

 Gosudarstvenny Nauchno-Ispytatel'nyy Poligon Aviatsionnykh System -  state research and test range for aircraft systems

 Gosudarstvenny Standart -  state standard

 Gosudarstvenny Optnyy Zavod – State Experimental Plant

 - civil experimental aeroplane construction

 Gosudarstvennoye Soyooznoye Opytno Konstrooktorskoye Byuro – State Union experimental design/construction bureau

 GSPI-7 institute

 Gosudarstvennyy Soyuznyy Zavod – State Union factory
 - ГУАП
 Главное управление авиационной промышленности - Glavnoye upravleniye uviatsionnoy promyshlennosti - Chief directorate of the aviation industry
 - ГУ ГВФ
 Главное управление гражданского воздушного флота - Glavnoye upravleniye grazhdanskovo vozdushnogo flota – Chief directorate of the civil air fleet

 Glavnoye Upravleniye Severnogo Morskogo Puti- main directorate of the northern sea route

 Glavnoye Upravleniye Voyenno Promishlennosti- main directorate of military industry

 Glavnoye Upravleniye Voyenno-Vozdushnykh Sil- main directorate of air force

 Grazdanskiy Vozdushniy Flot- civil air fleet

 – see TsIAM

 - metallurgical institute

 Institut Promishlennoy Energetiki - institute of industrial power engineering

 - Kazan aviation institute

 - A. M. Isayev Chemical Engineering Design Bureau

 Konstruktorskoye Byuro Radiostroyeniya – experimental design/construction bureau

 Konstruktorskoye Byuro 'Vnutrenn'aya Tyur'ma - Internal Prison Design Bureau

 Komitet  Gosudarstvennoy Bezopasnosti – state security committee

 Kharkovskii Aviatsionny Institut - Kharkov aviation institute

 Kharkovskii Traktorniy Zavod - Kharkov tractor factory

 Kievskoye Aviatsionnoye Proizvodstvennoye Ob"yedineniye – Kiev Aircraft Production Association

 Kievskiy Aviazavod – Kiev Aircraft Factory

 - Kiev Institute of civil aviation engineering

 Kazanskoe Motorostroitelnoe Proizvodsvennoe Obédinenie - Kazan Engine-building production Enterprise

 'Trood' Kiyevskiy Mashinostroitel'nyy Zavod 'Trud''' - 'Labour' Kiev Manufacturing plant

 Komitet Oboroni - defence committee

 Komissiya po Tyazhyeloi Aviatsii - commission for heavy aviation

 Kommunisticheskiy Soyuz Molodezhi - young communists union

 Krasnogorskiy Optiko-Mekhanicheskiy Zavod – Krasnogorsk optics and machinery plant

 Konstruktorskiy Otdel Sektora Opytnogo Stroitel'stva - section of experimental aeroplane construction

 Leningrahdskiy Institut Grazhdahnskovo [vozdooshnovo flota] – Leningrad Civil Air Fleet Institute

 Letno-Issledovatel'skiy Institut (Letno-issledovatelʹskiy institut, Narodnyy Komissariaht Aviatsionnoy Promyshlennosti) - flight research institute (of the state commissariat for aviation industry)

 Letnoispytatel'naya i Dovodochnaya Baza – design bureau flight test and mod facility

 - Leningrad institute for sail and communications engineers

 Leningradskoye Nauchno-Proizvodstvennoye Obyedineniye – Leningrad Scientific & Production Association 

 Letnyy Otryad – flight detachment [of an OAO]

 Moskovskii Aviatsionii Institut imeny Sergo Ordjoniidze -  Moscow aviation institute (named after Sergo Ordjoniidze) 

 Ministerstvo Aviatsionnoy Promyshlennosti - ministry of aviation industryGordon, Yefim. Lavochkin's Last Jets. Hinkley, Midland. 2004.  / 

 Moskovskoe Aviatsionnoye Proizvodstvennoye Obyedineniye – Moscow aircraft production association MiG

 Moskovskiy Aviaremontnyy Zavod – Moscow Aircraft Overhaul Plant

 Moskovskii Aviatsionii Technologicheskii Institut - Moscow aviation technological institute

 - EMERCOM Russia

 Ministerstvo Grazhdanskoy Aviahtsii – ministry of civil aviation

 Ministerstvo Grazdanskogo Vozdooshnogo Flota - ministry of civil aviation

 - Moscow institute of electronics

 Moskovskoye Mashinostroitel'noye Konstruktorskoye Byuro – Moscow mechanical engineering design bureau

 Moskovskiy Mashinostroitel'nyy Zavod – Moscow machine-building plant

 Moskovskiy Naoochno-Issledovatel'sky Institoot Priborostroyeniya – Moscow research institute of instrument engineering

 Moskovskaya Gruppa po Izucheniyu Reaktivnogo Dvizheniya - Moscow group for studying reactive movement

 Ministerstvo Oboronnoy Mashinostroyeniya – ministry of general machinery

 Ministerstvo Oboronnoy Promyshlennosti – ministry of defence industry

 - all-union association for experimental marine aircraft

 Ministerstvo Rahdioelektronnoy Promyshlennosti – ministry of electronics industry

 - ministry for internal affairs 1946-53

 Mezhvedomstvennaya Komissiya [po soglasovaniyu] Norm Lyotnoy Godnosti Samolyotov – inter-department airworthiness regulations co-ordinating commission

 Moskva Vyssheye Tekhnicheskoye - Moscow higher technical school

 Nauchno-Avtomobilnaya Laboratoriya - scientific auto-mobile laboratory

 Nauchnyy avtomotornyy Institut - scientific auto-motor institute

 Novosibirskoye Aviatsionnoye Proizvodstvenniye Obyedineniye – Novosibirsk aircraft production association

 - supreme directorate of aviation industry [became GUAP]

 Nizhegorodskiy AviaZavod – Nizhniy Novgorod aircraft factory

 Nauchno-Issledovatel'skiy Aero-Institut - scientific research aero-institute

 Nauchno-Issledovatel'skiy Institut Aviatsionnykh Teknologiy – scientific research institute of aviation technologies

 Nauchno-Issledovatel'skiy i  Eksperimenahl'nyy Institut  Parashootnodesahntnykh Sistem – Parachute Delivery systems Research and Experimental Institute

 Nauchno-Issledovatel'skiy Poligon Aviatsionnogo Vooruzheniya - research test range of aircraft armament

 Nauchno-Issledovatel'skiy Institut - scientific research institute more than 30 such as NII VVS,

 Nauchno-Issledovatel'skiy Institut Aviatsonnogo Oborudovaniya – avionics scientific research institute

 Nauchno-Issledovatel'skiy Institut Aviatsonnykh Sistem – aircraft systems scientific research instituteNauchno-Issledovatel'skiy Institut Aviadvigateley Grazdahnskovo Vozdooshnovo Flota - civil air fleet scientific research institute for aero-enginesNauchno-Issledovatel'skiy Institut Dvigateley Vnutrennego Sgoraniya - scientific research institute for internal combustion engines

 Nauchno-Issledovatel'skiy Institut Gosoodarstvennovo Komteta po Rahdioelektronike – state scientific research institute for electronicsNauchno-Issledovatel'skiy Institut Grazdahnskovo Vozdooshnovo Flota - civil air fleet scientific research institute

 Nauchno-Issledovatel'skiy Institut KhIMMash - scientific research institute for KhIMMash

 Nauchno-Issledovatel'skiy Institut Priborostroyeniya - scientific research institute for fine instruments

 Nauchno-Issledovatel'skiy Institut Rahdiostroyeniya - scientific research institute for radio equipment

 Nauchno-Issledovatel'skiy Institut Tochnykh Priborov - scientific research institute for fine instruments

 Nauchno-Issledovatel'skiy Institut Voyenno-Vozdooshnykh Seel – air force scientific research institute

 Nauchno-Issledovatel'skiy Institut Voyenno-Vozdushnykh Sil Krasnoy Armii – Red Army air force scientific research institute

 Nauchno-Issledovatel'skoye Otdeleniye (Otdel)  – research division (section)

 Nauchno-Issledovatel'skiy Tsentr Elektronno-Vychislitel'skiy Tekhniki – electronic/computing equipment research centre

 Narodnyy Komissariat Voyenno-Vozdushnykh Sil - people's commissariat for the Soviet air force

 Narodnyy Komissariat/Nauchno-Tekhnicheskiy Komitet Upravleniya Voyenno-Vozdushnykh Sil - people's Scientific committee/Scientific technical committee of the Soviet air force directorate

 Narodnyy Komissariat Aviatsionnoy Promyshlennosti - people's commissariat for aviation industryGordon, Yefim. Early Soviet Jet Fighters. Hinkley, Midland. 2002. 

 Narodnyy Komissariat Boyepripasov – people's commissariat of ordnance

 Narodnyy Komissariat Elektricheskoy Promyshlennosti -  people's commissariat for electrical engineering

 Narodnyy Komissariat Oborony - people's commissariat for defence

 Narodnyy Komissariat Oborony Promyshlennosti - people's commissariat for defence industry

 Narodnyy Komissariat Tyazheloy Promyshlennosti - people's commissariat for heavy industry

 Narodnyy Komissariat Vnutrennikh Del - people's commissariat for internal affairs 1934-46 became MVD

 Narodnyy Komissariat po Voenim i Morskim Delam - people's commissariat for military and naval affairs

 Narodnyy Komissariat Vneshney Torgovli - people's commissariat for foreign trade

 Nauchno Opitniy Aerodrom - scientific experimental airfield

 Nauchno-Proizvodstvennoe Ob'edinenie – Scientific and production corporation

 Nauchno-Proizvodstvennoe Ob'edinenie Roodgeofizika – Scientific and production corporation Rudgeofizika

 - Aeropower Research & Production Enterprise

 Otdel Aerodinamicheskiy Letnykh Ispytaniy i Dovodok – department of aerodynamics, flight test and development

 Obyedinennaya Aviastroitel'naya Korporatsiya – united aircraft manufacturing corporation

1. Obyedinyonnyy Aviaotryad – united flight detachment [of a UGA]
2. Otdel'nyy Aviaotryad – independent flight detachment [government airline]
3. Otkrytoye Aktsionehrnoye Obshchestvo [Tupolev] – Tupolev Public limited Company
4. OAO Ipromashprom Omskoye Aviatsionnoye Proizvodstvennoye Ob"yedineniye 'POLET' - flight production association in Omsk

 - society for aviation and gliding of Ukraine and Crimea

 Obshchestvo Druzey Vozdushnogo Flota- society of friends of the air fleet

 Ob'edinyonnoye Glavnoe Politicheskoe Upravlenie - united governmental political administration 1922-34 head Menzhinskii, became NKVD

 Опытное конструкторское бюро - Opytno Konstrooktorskoye Byuro – experimental design/construction bureau

 Opytno Konstrooktorskoye Byuro Motorostroeniya – experimental design/construction bureau for motor construction (modern acronym)

 Opytno Konstrooktorskoye Byuro Mashinostroeniya – experimental design/construction bureau for machine construction (early version of OKB)

 Opytno-konstruktorskoye - experimental design section Kiev  Tairov

 Ordena Lenina Akademiya Grazhdahnskoy Aviatsii – Leningrad Civil Aviation Academy decorated with the Order of Lenin

 Opitno-Motorniy Otdel- experimental motor department

 - department of marine experimental aircraft construction

 Otdel Neftyanikh Dvigateley- department of crude oil engines

 - department of special construction

 Otdel Opytnogo Samolyetostroeniya - section for experimental aircraft construction

 Opytnyy Otdel - experimental department

 Obshchestvo Sodeystviya Aviatsii i Khimii- society for assistance to aviation and chemical industry

 - department for special construction

 Obshchestvo sodeystviya Oborone – Defence Enhancement Society

 Otdel Sookhoputnykh Samolyotov - department for experimental land-plane construction

 Osoboe tekhnicheskoe byuro po voennym izobreteniyam spetsialnogo naznacheniya (Особое техническое бюро по военным изобретениям специального назначения) special technical bureau for military inventions

 Obshchestvo Spasaniya na Vodakh – Nautical Rescue Agency

 Osoboe Technicheskoye Byuro – special technical bureau

 Otdel Tekhnologicheskikh Laboratoriy – technical laboratories section

 - department of war intervention of RKKA

 Polyarnaya Aviatsiya – polar aviation

 Polyarnyy Institut Morskovo Rybnovo Khozyaystva I Okeanografii – polar institute of oceanic fishery and oceanography

 Permskoye Proizvodstvennoye Ob"yedineniye Motorostroyeniya – Perm engine production association

 Soviet Voennoy Promishlennostii – council of the defence industry

 Russkii Aviatsonniy Motor – Russian aviation motor

 Rusko-Baltiyskiy Vagonniy Zavod – Russo-Baltic Wagon Factory

 Revolutsionniy Voenniy Sovet – revolutionary military council

 Raschetno-Ispyatelnoye Byuro – Calculation and Testing Office

 Rizhskiy Institut Inzhenerov Grazhdahnskoy – Riga Civil Aviation Engineers Institute

 Rybinskoye Konstruktorskoye Byuro Motorostroyeniya – Rybinsk motor constructors burea

 Rizhskiy Krasnoznamennyy Institut Inzhenerov Grazhdahnskoy Aviatsii – Red Banner institute of civil aviation engineers

 Raboche-Krestyanskoy Krasnoy Armii - Vozdushniy Flot – Workers' and peasants' red army air fleet Raketnyy Nauchno-Issledovatel'skiy Institut - reaction engine scientific research institute

 Rossiyskoye Oboronnoye Sportivno-tekhnicheskoye Obschchestvo – russian Defence Sports and Technical Society Post USSR split

 Ramenskoye Priborno-Konstruktorskoye Byuro – Ramenskoye instrument design bureau

 - Russian Federation

 Rossiyskaya Samolyotostroitel'naya Korporatsiya – Russia aircraft construction corporation MiG

 Revolutsionniy Voenniy Sovet (or Revvoensovet) – revolutionary military council

 Sibirskiy Nauchno-Issledovatel'skiy Institut Aviatsii – Siberian aeronautical research institute

1. Spetsiahl'noye Konstruktorskoye Byuro – special design/construction bureau
2. Studencheskoye Konstruktorskoye Byuro - student construction bureau
3. Syerinoye Konstruktorskoye Byuro – series design/construction bureau

 Spetsiahl'noye Konstruktorskoye Byuro Rotorno-Porshnevikh Dvigateley Volzhskogo Avtomobilnogo Zavoda – special design/construction bureau for Wankel rotary engines of the Volga automoile factory

 Stupinskoye Konstruktorskoye Byuro Mashinostroyeniya – Stupino Machinery Design Bureau

 Seriyno-Konstruktorskiy Otdel – Production Design Department

 Samolyet Nauchno-Issledovatel'skiy Institut - aeroplane scientific research institute GVF

 Sovet Narodnykh Komissarov – council of peoples commissars – soviet government

 Sektor Opytnogo Stroitel'stva – prototype construction section

 Sovet Narodnikh Komissarov – council of people's commissars

 Sovet Narodnogo Khozyaystva –council of national economy

 Severnyy Polyus – north pole

 Sovet Truda i Oboroni – council of labour and defence

 Tashkentskoye Aviatsionnoye Proizvodstvennoye Ob"yedineniye – Tashkent aircraft production association

 Tul'skoye Konstruktorskoye Byuro – Tula design bureau

 Taganrogskiy Mashinostroitel'nyy Zavod Imeni Georgiya Dimitrova – Taganrog Machinery plant no.86 named after  Gheorgiya Dimitriova

 Tekhnicheskiy Otdel Ekonomicheskogo Upravleniya Ob'edinyonnoye Glavnoe Politicheskoe Upravlenie - technical department of the economic directorate of the special governmental political administrationЦентра́льный аэрогидродинами́ческий институ́т (ЦАГИ) Tsentralniy Aerogidrodinamicheskiy Institut, the Central Aerohydrodynamic Institute
 Tsentral'nyy Aerodinamicheskiy i Gidrodinamicheskiy Institut- central aerodynamics and hydrodynamics institute – may be written CAHI as an acronym of English words

 Tsentral'naya Aerologicheskaya Observatoriya – central aerologic observatory

 Tsentral'nyy Institut Aviatsionnovo Motorostroyeniya - central institute of aviation motors – may be written CIAM as an acronym of English words.

 Tsentral'noye Konstruktorskoye Byuro - central construction bureau

 Tsentral'noye Konstruktorskoye Byuro 29 Narodnyy Komissariat Vnutrennikh Del  - NKVD central construction bureau 29

 Tsentral'noye Konstruktorskoye Byuro  Glahvnoye Oopravleniye Aviatsionnoy Promyshlennosti - central construction bureau  main directorate of aviation industry

 TsKB Morskogo Samoletostroyeniya – central seaplane design bureau

 Tsentral'naya Laboratoriya Spasatel'noy Tekhniki – central laboratory for new types of rescue equipment

 Tsentral'nyy Nauchno-Issledovatel'skiy Dizelniy Institut – [ministry of defence] central scientific research diesel institute

 Tsentral'nyy Nauchno-Issledovatel'skiy Institut – [ministry of defence] central scientific research institute

 Tsentral'nyy Nauchno-Issledovatel'skiy Institut CherMet – central scientific research institute of Ferrous Metals

 Tsentral'noye Upravleniye Mezhdunarodnykh Vozdushnykh Soobshcheniy – central directorate for international services

 Tushinsky mashinostroitelny Zavod – Tushino engineering works

 Upravleniye Grazhdanskoy Aviatsii – Civil Aviation Directorate

 Ukrainskiy Institut Dvigateley Vnutrennego Sgoraniya – Ukrainian institute of internal combustion engines

 Ukrainskiy Nauchno-Issledovatel'skiy Aviadizelniy Institut – Ukrainian scientific research aviation diesel institute

 - training centre

 U K Grazdanskovo Vozdushnogo Flota - training centre for civil air fleet

 see UVP

 -

 - control board of navy

 - special work control

 Upravleniye Uchebnykh Zavedeniy – Training Establishments Directorate

 Upravleniye Voyenno-Vozdushnyye Flota – Training Establishment of the Soviet Air force fleet

 Ukrvosdukhput – Ukrainian airline

 Vsesoyuznoye Aviatsionnnoye Ob'yedineniye - all-union aircraft production association

 Vsesoyuzniy Institut Aviatsionnykh Materialov - all-union institute for aviation materials

 Vsesoyuznyy Institut Legkikh Splavov – All-Union Institute of Light-Alloys

 Vintomotorniy Otdel – propeller and motor department

 Vsesoyuznyy Nauchno-Issledovatel'skiy Dizelniy Institut – All-Union Scientific research diesel Institute

 Vsesoyuznyy Nauchno-Issledovatel'skiy Institut Motornoy Promishlennosti –All-Union Scientific research institute of the engine industry

 Vsesoyuznyy Nauchno-Issledovatel'skiy Institut Radioelektroniki I Avtomatiki – all-union electronics and automatic equipment research institute

 - Voronezh engine design bureau

1. Voyenno-Promyshlennaya Komissya – commission on military-industrial matters
2. Voyenno-Promyshlennyy Kompleks – defence industry complex

 Voyenno-Promyshlennyy Kompleks Moskovskoe Aviatsionnoye Proizvodstvennoye Ob"yedineniye – defence industry complex - Moscow aircraft production association defence industry complex

 Visshiy Sovet Narodnogo Khozyaystva -supreme council of the people's economy

 - internal prison

 Zaporozhskoye Motorno-Konstrooktorskoye Byuro ['Progress'] – Preogress Zaporozhskoye engine design bureau

 Zavod Opytno-konstruktorskoye - factory for special construction / experimental designs (interpretation unclear)

Military units

 - airborne forces of VVS

 Aviatsionnyy Diviziya - fighter air division

 Aviatsiya Dal'nevo Deystviya - long range aviation

 AviaDiveeziya Osobvo Naznacheniya – special mission air division

 Aviaeskadril'ya - air squadron

 Aviatsionnaya Ispytatel'naya Stantsiya, Morskaya Vedomsfva - naval air test station

 A Maksim Gorkii - propaganda squadron

 Aviatsionnyy Polk Istrebiteley Bombardirovshchikov – fighter-bomber regiment

 Aviatsionnyy Polk Samolyetov-Zaprahvshchikov – aerial refuelling regiment

 Aviaotryad - air detachment

 Aviatsiya Voyenno-Morskogo Flota - naval aviationBlizhne-bombardirovochnyye Polki - short range bomber air regiment

 Bombardirovchnyy Aviatsionnyy Polk - bomber regiment

 Dahl'nyaya Aviahtsiya - long-range aviation became ADD

 (Russian:фронтовой авиации) Frontovaya Aviatsiya – frontal aviation tactical aviation of VVS

 Gvardeyskiy istrebitel'nyy Aviatsionnyy Polk – Guards fighter regiment

 Gvardeyskiy Otdel'nyy Smeshannyy Aviatsionnyy Polk – guards independent composite air regiment

 Gvardeyskiy Tyazhelobombardirovochnyy Aviatsionnyy Polk – guards heavy bomber regimentInzhenerno-Aviatcionaya Sluzhba - Soviet and Russian Air Force acquisition and maintenance service

 Istrebitel'naya Aviatsionnyy Brigahda - fighter brigade

 Istrebitel'naya Aviatsionnyy Diveeziya - fighter air division

 Istrebitel'nyy Aviatsionnyy Polk - fighter regiment

 Istrebitel'naya Aviahtsiya - Protivovozdushnaya Oborona  - manned fighter branch of PVO

 Leningradskaya Krasnoznamennaya Voyenno-Vozdushnaya Inzhenernaya Akademiya – Leningrad red banner military air academy

 Morskaya Aviahtsiya - naval aviation became AV-MF

 Mestnaya Protivovozdushnaya Oborona – local air defence forces

 Minno-torpednyi Aviatsionnyi Polk – minelaying and torpedo-bomber regiment

 Nauchno-Issledovatel'skii i Uchebno-Trenirovchnnyi Kompleks – R&D and training complex ground facility for carrier arresting landings trials and training 

 Otdel'nyy Aviatsionnyy Otryad – independent flight detachment

 otdel'naya Dahl'nyaya Razvedyvatel'naya Aviaeskadril'ya Independent Long-Range Reconnaissance Squadron

 - independent naval aviation group

 Otdel'nyy Minno-Torpednyy AviaPolk – independent minelaying and torpedo-bomber regiment

 Otdel'nyy Protivolodochnyy Aviatsionnyy Polk Dahl'nevo Deystviya – independent long-range ASW regiment

 Otdel'naya  Protivolodochnaya Aviatsionnyy Eskadril'ya – independent ASW squadron Independent ASW Air Squadron

 Otdel'naya Smeshannaya Aviatsionnyy Eskadril'ya – composite air squadron

 Otdel'nyy Smeshannyy Aviatsionnyy polk – composite air regiment

 Protivovozdushnaya Oborona – air defence forces

 Raboche-Krest'yanskaya Krasnaya Armiya – workers and peasants Red Army

 Shturmovaya Aviatsionnyy Diveeziya – Ground attack air division

 Shturmovoy Aviatsionnyy Korpoos – Ground attack air corps

 Shturmovoy Aviatsionnyy Polk – Ground attack air regiment

 Shkola Mladshikh Aviatsionnykh Spetsialistov – junior aviation specialists school

 Smeshannaya Aviatsionnyy Diveeziya – composite air division

 Smeshannaya Aviatsionnyy Polk – composite air regiment

 Stavka – Supreme High Command

 Severnaya Gruppa Voysk – Northern Group of Forces 

 Tyazhelobombardirovochnyy Aviapolk – heavy bomber regiment

 Transportno-Desantnaya Aviatsiya – transport and assault aviation

 Tsentr Boyevoy Podogotovki i  Pereuchivaniya Letnogo Sostava – combat & conversion training centre

 Tsentrahl'naya Grooppa Voysk – Central forces Group

 Tambovskoye Vyssheye Voyennoye Aviatsionnoye Oochilishche Lyotchikov – Tambov higher military pilot school

 Oochebnyy AviaPolk – instructional regiment

 Unifitsirovanny Blok – unified unit

 Uchebnyy Istrebitel'nyy AviaPolk – instructional fighter regiment

 Upravleniye Opytnovo Stroitel'stva Aviatsionnoy Tekhniki – Soviet Ari force experimental aircraft construction department

 Upravlenie Voyenno-Vozdooshnyye Flota - administration of the military air fleet

 Upravlenie Voyenno-Vozdooshnyye Seely - administration of the VVS/ air force directorate

 Vozdushnaya Armiya – Air Army

 Vozdushno-Desantnyye Voyska – airborne troops

 Voenno-morskoj flot - Naval Fleet Russian: Военно-морской флот СССР, Voyenno-Transportnaya Aviahtsiya – military transport aviation

 Voynno-Vozdushnaya Akademiya - VVS academy Zhukovskii

 Vyesheye Voyennoye Aviatsiionnoye Uchilishche Lyotchikov – military flying college

 Vyesheye Voyennoye Aviatsiionnoye Uchilishche Shturmanov – Military Navigator College

 Voyenno-Vozdushnyye Flota - Air Forces 

 - VVA engineering academy

 Voyenno-Vozdushnyye Sily - Soviet air force

 Voyenno-Vozdushnyye Sily Raboche-Krest'yanskaya Krasnaya Armiya - Soviet air force of the Workers'and peasants'red army

 Yuzhnaya Gruppa Voysk – Southern forces Group

 Zapasnoy  Aviatsionnyy/Aviapolk – reserve air/fighter regiment

 Zapadnaya Gruppa Voysk – Western Group of Forces

 Zavod Opitnikh Konstruktsiy – factory of experimental designs

Soviet military academies

"ACEC" Moscow Military School

A. Mozhaysky Military Space Academy

A.S. Popov Naval Radioelectronics Institute

Academy of the General Staff

Admiral F.F. Ushakov Baltic Naval Institute

Admiral P.S. Nakhimov Naval School  (Leningrad-1944, Tbilisi-1944, and Riga-1945)

Armed Forces Academy of Humanities

Budyonny Military Academy of Communications

Combined Arms Academy of the Armed Forces of the Russian Federation, (:ru:Общевойсковая академия Вооружённых Сил Российской Федерации)

Combined Arms Academy

Combined Arms Military Academy of the Armed Forces of the Russian Federation-Military Engineering Forces Institute

Dzerzhinsky Military Academy

F. Derzhinskiy Higher Naval Engineering School

Felix Dzerzhinsky Military Rocket Forces Academy

Felix E. Dzerzhinsky Artillery Academy (Артиллерийская академия имени Ф. Э. Дзержинского)

Field Marshal Alexander Suvorov Moscow Military Music School

Fleet Admiral of the Soviet Union N.G. Kuznetsov Naval Academy

Gagarin Air Force Academy In 2008, it has been amalgamated with the Zhukovsky Air Force Engineering Academy. Joint academy was named Zhukovsky – Gagarin Air Force Academy

General of the Army A. V. Khruleva Military Academy of Rear Services and Transportation 

General Staff Academy of the Armed Forces of Ukraine

Higher Naval Engineering School

Kronshtadt Naval Cadet Corps

J.V. Stalin Academy

Kalinin Artillery Military Academy

Khabarovsk Military Commanders Training Academy

Kharkiv Military University

Kharkiv National University of the Ukrainian Air Force

Kuybyshev Military Medical Academy

Leningrad Military Academy of Physical Fitness "General Staff of the Armed Forces"

Leningrad Nikolaevsky Military Engineering Technical Institute of the Armed Forces of the USSR

Leninskiy Komsomol Submarine Navigation High Naval School

M. V. Frunze High Naval School   ;M. V. Frunze Military Academy

Malinovsky Academy

Marshal Alexander Vasilevsky Military Academy of the Army Air Defense Corps

Marshal Rodion Malinovsky Military Armoured Forces Academy

Marshal A.A. Grechko Naval Academy

Marshal Georgy Zhukov Command Academy of the Air Defense Forces

Marshal of the Soviet Union L.A. Govorov Air Defense Radio Engineering Academy

Marshal Semyon Budyonny Military Signals and Communications Academy

Marshal Semyon Timoshenko Military Academy of Chemical Defense and Control

Mikhail Kalinin Military Artillery Academy

Kalinin Artillery Military Academy

Mikhailovskaya Artillery Academy (Михайловская артиллерийская академия)

Mikhailovskaya Artillery Military Academy

Military Artillery Academy "Grand Duke Mikhail Pavlovich"

Military Air Combat Training Centers

Center of Frontline Aviation, Lipetsk Air Base
Center of Air Defense Aviation, Savasleika Саваслейка)
Center of Naval Aviation of the Russian Navy, Ostrov (air base), near Pskov
Center of Long Range Aviation, Dyagilevo

Military Educational and Scientific Center (Russ. ВУНЦ) Note Military Educational and Scientific Center (MESC) is a type of the institution, not a single military entity. E.g. " Russian Air Force MESC Zhukovsky – Gagarin Air Force Academy". About 10 MESCs were established 2000s.

Military Engineering University of St. Petersburg

Military Engineering-Technical University

Military Institute of Foreign Languages now part of the Military University of the Ministry of Defense of Russian Federation

Military Technical Academy

Military University of the Ministry of Defense of Russian Federation (Военный университет Министерства обороны Российской Федерации)

Ministry of Defence Institute

Ministry of Emergency Situations Civil Defence Academy

Ministry of the Interior of Russia High Command Academy

Moscow Felix Dzerzhinsky Federal Security Service Academy

Moscow High Command Training School "Supreme Soviet of the Russian Socialist Federative Soviet Republic"

Moscow Military Commanders Training School

Moscow Military Institute of the Russian FSS

Moscow Military School of Infantry Training

Moscow Military School

MVD Central School

Naval Engineering Institute

Nikolaevsky Military Engineering-Technical Institute of the Armed Forces

Nikolai Zhukovsky Air Force Engineering Academy

Peter the Great Military Academy of the Strategic Missile Force * Peter the Great Military Academy of the Strategic Missile Force (official Web Site) 

Peter the Great Naval Corps - St. Petersburg Naval Institute

Red Army Military Technical Academy

RKKA Military Academy

S.O. Makarov Pacific Naval Institute

School of Mathematics and Navigational Sciences

Sergei Kirov Military Medical Academy

St. Peterburg Military Engineering-Technical University

St. Petersburg Military Academy of Physical Fitness Culture and Sports

St. Petersburg Military Institute of Civil Defence of the Ministry of Emergency Situations

St. Petersburg MVD Internal Troops Military Institute

St. Petersburg University of the Ministry of Internal Affairs of Russia Fleet Admiral Of the Soviet Union N.G. Kuznetsov Naval Academy

V.I. Lenin Political-Military Academy 

Valerian Kuybyshev Military Engineering Academy

Volsk Military Rear Services Training School

[[WPRA 1st Soviet High Military School "All-Russian Central Executive Committee]]

WPRA Academy of Mechanized and Motorized Service

Yekaterinburg Force Command School of Artillery

Yuri Gagarin Military Air Academy 

Zhukovsky Air Force Engineering Academy In 2008, it has been amalgamated with the Gagarin Air Force Academy. Joint academy was named Zhukovsky – Gagarin Air Force Academy

Zhukovsky – Gagarin Air Force Academy

Kirov Military Medical Academy

References

Bibliography
Gordon, Yefim. Early Soviet Jet Bombers. Hinkley, Midland. 2004. 
Gordon, Yefim. Early Soviet Jet Fighters. Hinkley, Midland. 2002. 
Gordon, Yefim. Sukhoi Interceptors. Hinkley, Midland. 2004. 
Gordon, Yefim. Soviet Rocket Fighters. Hinkley, Midland. 2006.  / 
Gordon, Yefim. Soviet Heavy Interceptors. Hinkley, Midland. 2004. 
Gordon, Yefim. Lavochkin's Last Jets. Hinkley, Midland. 2004.  / 
Gordon, Yefim & Komissarov, Dmitry & Komissarov, Sergey. OKB Ilyushin. Hinkley, Midland. 2004. 
Gunston, Bill. The Osprey Encyclopaedia of Russian Aircraft 1875–1995. London, Osprey. 1995. 
Antonov, Vladimir & Gordon, Yefim & others. OKB Sukhoi. Leicester. Midland. 1996. 
Gordon, Yefim & Komissarov, Dmitry & Sergey. OKB Yakovlev. Hinkley. Midland. 2005. 
Gordon, Yefim & Komissarov, Dmitry. OKB Mikoyan. Hinkley, Midland. 2009. 
Gordon, Yefim & Komissarov, Dmitry & Sergey. OKB Ilyushin. Hinkley. Midland. 2004. 
Gordon, Yefim & Rigmant, Vladimir. Tupolev Tu-144. Midland. Hinkley. 2005.  
Gordon, Yefim & Komissarov, Dmitry. Antonov An-12. Midland. Hinkley. 2007.  
Gordon, Yefim & Komissarov, Dmitry & Komissarov, Sergey. Mil's Heavylift Helicopters. Hinkley, Midland. 2005. 
Gordon, Yefim. Tupolev Tu-160 "Blackjack". Hinkley, Midland. 2003. 
Gordon, Yefim & Komissarov, Dmitry. Antonov's Jet Twins. Hinkley, Midland. 2005. 
Gordon, Yefim & Komissarov, Dmitry. Kamov Ka-27/-32 Family. Hinkley, Midland. 2006.  
Gordon, Yefim & Komissarov, Dmitry. Antonov An-2. Midland. Hinkley. 2004. 
Gordon, Yefim & Rigmant, Vladimir. Tupolev Tu-114. Midland. Hinkley. 2007.  
Gordon, Yefim & Komissarov, Dmitry. Ilyushin Il-12 and Il-14. Midland. Hinkley. 2005.  
Gordon, Yefim. Yakovlev Yak-36, Yak-38 & Yak-41. Midland. Hinkley. 2008. 
Gordon, Yefim & Komissarov, Dmitry & Sergey. Antonov's Turboprop Twins. Hinkley. Midland. 2003. 
Gordon, Yefim. Myasischev M-4 and 3M. Hinkley. Midland. 2003. 
Gordon, Yefim & Rigmant, Vladimir. Tupolev Tu-104. Midland. Hinkley. 2007. 
Gordon, Yefim & Komissarov, Dmitry. Mil Mi-8/Mi-17. Hinkley. Midland. 2003. 
Gordon, Yefim & Dexter, Kieth Polikarpov's I-16 Fighter. Hinkley. Midland. 2001. 
Gordon, Yefim. Mikoyan MiG-25 "Foxbat". Hinkley. Midland. 2007.  
Gordon, Yefim & Dexter, Kieth Mikoyan's Piston-Engined Fighters. Hinkley. Midland. 2003. 
Gordon,Yefim & Rigmant, Vladimir. Tupolev Tu-4. Midland. Hinkley. 2002. 
Gordon,Yefim. Sukhoi S-37 and Mikoyan MFI. Midland. Hinkley. 2001 reprinted 2006.  
Gordon, Yefim & Khazanov, Dmitry. Yakovlev's Piston-Engined Fighters. Hinkley. Midland. 2002. 
Gordon, Yefim & Sal'nikov, Andrey. Zablotsky, Aleksandr. Beriev's Jet Flying Boats. Hinkley. Midland. 2006.  
Gordon,Yefim. & Dexter, Keith. Polikarpov's Biplane Fighters. Hinkley. Midland Publishing. 2002. 
Gordon, Yefim. Soviet/Russian Aircraft Weapons. Midland. 2004. 
Koletnikov, Vladimir. Russian Piston Aero Engines. Marlborough. The Crowood Press. 2005. 

Glossaries of Russian and USSR aviation
Aviation organizations
Military terminology
Military of the Soviet Union
Military of Russia
Wikipedia glossaries using description lists